The 1977 Virginia Slims of Seattle  was a women's tennis tournament played on indoor carpet courts at the Seattle Center Arena  in Seattle, Washington in the United States that was part of the 1977 Virginia Slims World Championship Series. It was the inaugural edition of the tournament and was held from January 31 through February 6, 1977. First-seeded Chris Evert won the singles title and earned $20,000 first-prize money.

Finals

Singles
 Chris Evert defeated  Martina Navratilova 6–2, 6–4
 It was Evert's 2nd singles title of the year and the 69th of her career.

Doubles
 Rosie Casals /  Chris Evert defeated  Françoise Dürr /  Martina Navratilova 6–4, 3–6, 6–3

Prize money

See also
 Evert–Navratilova rivalry

References

External links
 ITF tournament edition details

Virginia Slims of Seattle
Virginia Slims of Seattle
Virginia Slims of Seattle
Virginia Slims of Seattle
Virginia Slims of Seattle
Tennis in Washington (state)